Three Busy Debras is an American surreal comedy television series created, written by, and starring Sandy Honig, Alyssa Stonoha, and Mitra Jouhari. It premiered on Cartoon Network's late-night programming block, Adult Swim on March 30, 2020 and ended on May 23, 2022, with a total of 16 episodes over the course of two seasons.

Premise
Three Busy Debras follows "the surreal day-to-day lives of three deranged housewives, all named Debra, in their affluent suburban town of Lemoncurd."

Cast 
 Sandy Honig as Debra
 Alyssa Stonoha as Debra
 Mitra Jouhari as Debra

Production 
The concept originally began as a play which was created by and starred Mitra Jouhari, Sandy Honig, and Alyssa Stonoha. It was later extended to a web series.

On May 8, 2018, Adult Swim announced that it had ordered a pilot of the show, written by Sandy Honig and directed by Anna Dokoza. On May 7, 2019, Adult Swim gave the quarter hour comedy a series order.

On February 12, 2020, it was announced that the series would premiere on March 29, 2020.

The show is executive produced by Amy Poehler and Kim Lessing through Paper Kite Productions. Show creators Sandy Honig, Mitra Jouhari, Alyssa Stonoha and director Anna Dokoza also serve as executive producers through Mail Lizard. Alive and Kicking, Inc. produces the series.

The creators have cited a number of influences on the show including SpongeBob SquarePants, The Real Housewives, Garth Marenghi's Darkplace, Clue and Looney Tunes.

On May 31, 2020, Adult Swim renewed the series for a second season. On July 26, 2022, it was announced that the show would not be returning for a third season.

Episodes

Series overview

Pilot

Season 1 (2020)

Season 2 (2022)

Notes

References

External links 
 Three Busy Debras on Adult Swim
 

2020 American television series debuts
2022 American television series endings
2020s American comedy television series
Adult Swim original programming
English-language television shows
Television series by Paper Kite Productions
Television series by Williams Street
Television shows set in Connecticut
Fictional trios